Hartcliff Rocks Quarry is a 1.6 hectare (3.9 acre) Site of Special Scientific Interest (SSSI) near Felton, Somerset notified in 1991.

According to the citation, the site "provides exposures of Triassic Dolomitic Conglomerate unconformably overlying Carboniferous Limestone."

References

External links
Natural England - SSSI information - Hartcliff Rocks Quarry 

Bath and North East Somerset
Sites of Special Scientific Interest in Avon
Sites of Special Scientific Interest notified in 1991
Quarries in Somerset